Dargida is a genus of moths of the family Noctuidae.

Species
 Dargida acanthus (Herrich-Schäffer, [1869])
 Dargida acca (Herrich-Schäffer, [1869])
 Dargida albifluviata (Druce, 1905)
 Dargida albilinea (Hübner, [1821])
 Dargida albistriga (Druce, 1908)
 Dargida albomarginata (Druce, 1898)
 Dargida albostriata (Druce, 1911)
 Dargida aleada Smith, 1908
 Dargida amoena (Draudt, 1924)
 Dargida calographa (Maassen, 1890)
 Dargida clavifera (Hampson, 1909)
 Dargida clavisigna (Hampson, 1913)
 Dargida confundibilis Köhler, 1973
 Dargida diffusa (Walker, 1856)
 Dargida dissentanea (Draudt, 1924)
 Dargida disticta (Druce, 1908)
 Dargida egregia (Draudt, 1924)
 Dargida elaeistis (Druce, 1905)
 Dargida eugrapha (Hampson, 1909)
 Dargida exoul (Walker, 1856)
 Dargida faeculenta (Draudt, 1924)
 Dargida fluminalis (Dognin, 1911)
 Dargida ganeo (Draudt, 1924)
 Dargida graminea Schaus, 1894
 Dargida grammivora Walker, 1856
 Dargida gumia (Draudt, 1924)
 Dargida hieroglyphera (Maassen, 1890)
 Dargida imitata (Maassen, 1890)
 Dargida jucunda (Maassen, 1890)
 Dargida jucundissima (Zerny, 1916)
 Dargida leucoceps (Hampson, 1913)
 Dargida melanoleuca (Druce, 1908)
 Dargida meridionalis (Hampson, 1905)
 Dargida mesotoma (Hampson, 1909)
 Dargida multistria (Köhler, 1947)
 Dargida napali (Köhler, 1959)
 Dargida nectaristis (Draudt, 1924)
 Dargida oenistis (Druce, 1905)
 Dargida polygona (Hampson, 1905)
 Dargida procinctus – olive green cutworm (Grote, 1873)
 Dargida quadrannulata (Morrison, 1875)
 Dargida resputa (Draudt, 1924)
 Dargida rubripennis (Grote & Robinson, 1870)
 Dargida scripta (Maassen, 1890)
 Dargida terrapictalis Buckett, 1967, [1969]
 Dargida tetera (Smith, 1902)
 Dargida tridens (Köhler, 1947)
 Dargida uncifera (Maassen, 1890)
 Dargida uncisigna (Hampson, 1913)
 Dargida violascens (Maassen, 1890)

References
 Dargida at Markku Savela's Lepidoptera and Some Other Life Forms
 Natural History Museum Lepidoptera genus database

Hadeninae